The Triumphs of Truth was a medieval pageant to honor a British Lord mayor and written circa 1613 by English Renaissance playwright Thomas Middleton. The pageant was credited with first creating the term white people to refer to Europeans.

References

See also
White people

Works by Thomas Middleton
Works about white people
Plays by Thomas Middleton